Senad Žerić (born 4 September 1977) is a Bosnian retired football player, who works for the FK Željezničar Youth Academy.

Club career
Born in Sarajevo, he scored 41 goals in 204 matches for hometown club Željezničar.

International career
Žerić made his debut for Bosnia and Herzegovina in an August 1999 friendly match away against Liechtenstein and has earned a total of 5 caps (1 unofficial), scoring no goals. His final international was a January 2001 Millenium Cup match against Serbia and Montenegro.

Personal life
His son Denis Žerić is also a professional footballer.

References

External links

Profile - NFSBIH

1977 births
Living people
Footballers from Sarajevo
Association football forwards
Bosnia and Herzegovina footballers
Bosnia and Herzegovina international footballers
FK Željezničar Sarajevo players
NK Jedinstvo Bihać players
NK TOŠK Tešanj players
Dunaújváros FC players
Premier League of Bosnia and Herzegovina players
First League of the Federation of Bosnia and Herzegovina players
Nemzeti Bajnokság II players
Bosnia and Herzegovina expatriate footballers
Expatriate footballers in Hungary
Bosnia and Herzegovina expatriate sportspeople in Hungary